Orhan Karaveli (born 1930) is a Turkish journalist and writer.

Personal life
Orhan Karaveli's family was a member of Karaevli Turkmen tribe  .(Their surname reflects their tribe name with a transposition of two letters) Orhan was born to Mahmut and his wife Rafia in Ankara on 26 February 1930. He attended İstiklal primary school in 1936. But next year he was transferred to Galatasaray primary school in Istanbul. He continued his secondary education in Galatasaray High School till 1949. Although he began studying in the law school of Istanbul University, he took a pause for his military service in the anti aircraft school. He resumed his university education up to 1954. He also studied in the University of Westminster for one year.

He is married and father of three.

Career
He began his journalism career while he was still in the university. His first paid-article was published in the periodical Her Hafta in 1948 about a reclusive man in Uludağ ( a mountain close to Bursa). He served in  the newspaper Yeni İstanbul between 1950-1954. During this period he also supported his elder brother Nihat Karaveli in publishing the first sexual health periodical Cinsi Bilgiler Mecmuası (beginning by April 1949) for 60 months. In 1955, he moved to Berlin and London to serve as the European-correspondent of the daily Milliyet for three years. While in London he frequently flew to Cyprus for  Cyprus issue news. After returning home he became a part-time correspondent of News Chronicle in Turkey  Later, he also served for the  Vatan newspaper . While he was working for Vatan he was sent to the United States for two and a half months in 1959. He spent a part of his visit in Professor John A. Garraty's house who was a friend of his. He accompanied Adnan Menderes , the Turkish Prime Minister in his visits in the United States. Some of his other notable foreign visits and interviews were to Cuba during the early days of the Communist rule, in 1960  to Soviet Union to watch a congress of orianalism in which he interviewed Nazım Hikmet, in 1961 to Jugoslavia to watch the Non-Aligned Conference in which he spoke to Jawaharlal Nehru and Josip Broz Tito.In 1960s after his father had a stroke he undertook his father’s business which was mainly mining.  After improving the business he returned to journalism  and served   for Cumhuriyet  both as a reporter and a columnist. In 1977 and 1998 he received the Turkey Journalists Association Achievement Award. He is a member of Turkish Journalists Association and has a Press Honor Card (Basın şeref kartı).

Works
Orhan karaveli wrote twelve books: 
Kişiler ve Köşeler (1982) His impressions about the US (when he accompanied the Turkish prime minister Adnan Menderes to the US in 1959)
Bir Ankara Ailesinin Öyküsü ( 1999) Memories about his childhood in Ankara
1946-1999 Şiirler (1999) poems
Görgü Tanığı (2001) His memories as a writer
Tanıdığım Nazım Hikmet (2002) Biography of the Turkish poet Nazım Hikmet
Sakallı Celal (2004) Biography of the Turkish philosopher Celal Yalınız 
Tevfik Fikret ve Haluk Gerçeği (2004) Biography of the Turkish poet Tevfik Fikret and his son Haluk
Ziya Gökalp'i Doğru Tanımak (2008) Biography of Ziya Gökalp, a man of letters
Ali Kemal Belki de Günah Keçisi (2009): Biography of  Ali Kemal a journalist who was lynched 
Berlin'in Yalnız Kadınları (2012) About the women in 1950s Berlin
Kendi heykelini Yapan Adam İlhan Selçuk (2012) Biography of the Turkish journalist İlhan Selçuk
O Olmasaydı (2014) About the Gallipoli Campaign

References

Sources

External links
Orhan Karaveli Book covers

1930 births
People from Ankara
Galatasaray High School alumni
Istanbul University Faculty of Law alumni
Turkish journalists
Milliyet people
Cumhuriyet people
Turkish biographers
Living people